Procaccini is the name of a prominent family of artists from the Renaissance and Baroque periods, active mainly in Bologna and Milan. They include:

Ercole Procaccini the Elder (1520 – after 1591), father of Camillo, Giulio Cesare, and Carlo Antonio
Camillo Procaccini (1551–1629), son of Ercole
Carlo Antonio Procaccini (born 1555), son of Ercole the Elder and father of Ercole the Younger
Giulio Cesare Procaccini (1574–1625), son of Ercole
Ercole Procaccini the Younger (1605–1675), son of Carlo Antonio
Andrea Procaccini (1671–1734)